Karl Albert Hasselbalch (1 November 1874 – 19 September 1962) was a Danish physician and chemist known for his work on the Henderson–Hasselbalch equation.

Early life and education
Hasselbalch was born in Åstrup, near Hjørring, Denmark on 1 November 1874. Hasselbalch received his medical degree in 1898 and his doctorate in 1899 for his thesis on the respiratory metabolism in the chicken embryo.

Career
Hasselbalch was a pioneer in the use of pH measurement in medicine (with Christian Bohr, father of Niels Bohr), and he described how the affinity of blood for oxygen was dependent on the concentration of carbon dioxide. He was also first to determine the pH of blood. In 1916, he converted the 1908 equation of Lawrence Joseph Henderson to logarithmic form, which is now known as the Henderson–Hasselbalch equation.

References

Danish scientists
1874 births
1962 deaths